Leslie Glenard Shepherd (born November 3, 1969) is a former professional American football player in the National Football League. He played seven years, the first five with the Washington Redskins, and one apiece for the Cleveland Browns and the Miami Dolphins. Arguably his best season came in 1998, when he had nine touchdowns, eight receiving and one rushing.

He now coaches at Gwynn Park High School in Brandywine, Maryland.

He is the father of 5th year UVA football player Khalek Shepherd and Chaudlier Shepherd of Concord University, who are also looking to follow in their father's footsteps.

1969 births
Living people
People from Washington, D.C.
American football wide receivers
Temple Owls football players
Washington Redskins players
Cleveland Browns players
Miami Dolphins players
People from Brandywine, Maryland
Pittsburgh Steelers players